Taher Saifuddin (4 August 1888 – 12 November 1965), also known as Tahir Sayf al-Din, was the 51st and longest serving Da'i al-Mutlaq of the Dawoodi Bohras. Saifuddin adapted the modernisation in Western and European ideas, and established its benefits for the Bohras, whilst still steeped in the traditions and the culture of the community's Fatimid heritage. Saifuddin laid substantial groundwork in terms of philanthropy, education, entrepreneurship, social outreach, political outreach, and community upliftment upon which his successors, Mohammed Burhanuddin and Mufaddal Saifuddin, continued to build, resulting in unprecedented era of prosperity among the Dawoodi Bohras.

Early life
Taher Saifuddin was born to Mohammed Burhanuddin I and Amatullah Aaisaheba on 4 August 1888 in Surat, British India (present day the state of Gujarat).

Da'i al-Mutlaq

Saifuddin became the 51st al-Dāʿī al-Mutlaq in the year 1915 at the age of 28.

During his reign, he rebuilt and repaired many monuments of the Fatimid Imams, al-Dāʿī al-Mutlaq, and other structures, and artifacts.

Education
Saifuddin was instrumental in setting up over 350 co-ed institutes, some of which bear his name, including but not limited to: Aljamea-tus-Saifiyah in Surat, Saifee Hall in Calcutta, Saifiyah Girls School in Karachi, Saifi High in Mumbai, Saifee Nursery at Saifee Mahal in Mumbai, Saifee Eide Zahabi College in Karachi, Saifee Golden Jubilee Quaderia College in Burhanpur, Saifee Jubilee Arts and Commerce College in Sidhpur. Mohammed Burhanuddin later organized the schools under the banner of MSB Educational Institute (also known as Al Madrasa Tus Saifiya Tul Burhaniyah), which are affiliated with Indian Certificate of Secondary Education and, as of 2011, has branches in 22 cities across India, Pakistan, East Africa, and the Middle East. Burhanuddin organized the numerous religious schools world-wide known as Madrasas under the purview of the department of Attalim.

Saifuddin was appointed the Chancellor of Aligarh Muslim University for four consecutive terms, starting in 1953. Under Saifuddin's chancellorship, Jawaharlal Nehru, first Prime Minister of India, laid the foundation of Asia's largest library, the Maulana Azad Library, at AMU.

Aljamea-tus-Saifiyah

Saifuddin from his own personal wealth renovated Dars-e Saifee, an institution of Islamic studies, founded by his predecessor Abdeali Saifuddin  in Surat, transformed it in to a university by introducing secular courses and establishing affiliations with international educational bodies, and consequently renamed it Aljamea-tus-Saifiyah.

Keeping in line with tradition of his predecessor, Ismail Badr al-Din I, the talabat al-ilm of the institution were provided with lodging and meals at full cost to the office of Dai al-Mutlaq. To further inclusion and expansion, Saifuddin admitted to Aljamea its first female students. As is tradition, in his capacity as Dai al-Mutlaq, Saifuddin personally taught select classes at the newly renovated Academy. Saifuddin brought about a structural and functional change at Aljamea: He personally oversaw the standardization of the syllabus of each class and wrote numerous memoranda and treatises which were instilled into the curriculum. To this day, the treatises written by Saifuddin and his successors, Mohammed Burhanuddin and Mufaddal Saifuddin, are taught through the year and are central subjects of al-Imtihan al-Sanawi, among other religious and secular subjects.

After succeeding his father, Burhanuddin significantly expanded the reach of Aljamea: He added Mahad al-Zahra, an institute of Quranic studies , re-renovated the Surat campus , established campuses at Karachi , Nairobi , and Mumbai . Aljamea and its graduates have since become integral to spiritual and temporal aspects of the Dawoodi Bohra community.

Community service

In a similar vein, Saifuddin established an organisation of Dawoodi Bohra men, Shabab ul-Eid iz-Zahabi, during the Golden Jubilee celebrations of his 50 years in the office of Dai al-Mutlaq, exclusively for community service. Mohammed Burhanuddin would later found the Burhani Guards (for crowd-control at miqaats ), Tolaba ul-Kulliyat il-Mumenoon (of college and school students), Burhani Medical Idara (of medical professionals), Saifee Ambulance in India, and Burhani Ambulance in Pakistan (of paramedics and first responders). Mufaddal Saifuddin, on his first visit to North America, established Saifee Burhani Medical Association (America), on 14 March 2015.

Rasm-e Saifee

To subsidize costs and facilitate marriages among the close knit Dawoodi Bohra, Saifuddin initiated Rasm-e Saifee in Jamnagar  and later institutionalised it . Rasm-e Saifee is a singular occasion when multiple Nikah are solemnized at the hands of the Da'i al-Mutlaq and his representatives. Burhanuddin further organized it under International Taiyseer al-Nikah Committee (ITNC), which organizes Rasm-e Saifee throughout the year at various miqaats. Burhanuddin's successor, Mufaddal Saifuddin, continues to uphold the tradition.

Contributions to Islamic Institutions

Saifuddin contributed vast sums of money towards the refurbishment of mosques and shrines. He along with the Nizam of Hyderabad were among the few Indian Muslims to contribute towards the renovation of Al Aqsa Mosque in Jerusalem:

Sultan Taher Saif al-Din is said to have come from India with one hundred and fifty of his followers...At the Jerusalem station he was welcomed by the Mufti and other Sheikhs of the Supreme Moslem Council and a number of Arab notables including Ragheb Bey Nashashibi. A troop of Arab boy scouts paraded in his honour and there were two bands from Moslem institutions...The sultan was reputed to be a man of great wealth who had made substantial contributions to the religious and political funds of the Arabs of this country.

Saifuddin also gifted the internal curtains which were kept in the Kaaba for decades to King Abdul Aziz of Saudi Arabia in 1354AH, with whom he kept warm relations.

Saifuddin constructed Ghurrat-ul Masajid, also known as Saifee Masjid, in Mumbai, Al-Mahal al-Saifee for pilgrims in Mecca, the zarih of Ali Ibn Abi Talib in Najaf and  Husayn ibn Ali in Karbala and Cairo, the mausoleum of Qutub Khan Qutub al-Din and Fakhr al-Din Shaheed. He also made and donated the kiswah for the Masjid al-Haram.

The Chandabhoy Galla Case

Family

Saifuddin married Husaina Aaisaheba, who was also from the family of the Du'at Mutlaqeen. After her death, he then married Vazira Aaisaheba, Fatima Aaisaheba, and Amina Aaisaheba.

Saifuddin had 12 sons and 8 daughters: His sons were Mohammed Burhanuddin, Husain Husamuddin, Abdut Taiyeb Zakiyuddin, Yusuf Najmuddin, Ismail Shehabuddin, Hatim Hamiduddin, Qasim Hakimuddin, Aliasgar Kalimuddin, Shabbir Nooruddin, Abbas Fakhruddin, Mohammed al-Baqir Jamaluddin, and Khuzaima Qutbuddin. His daughters were Asma, Maryam, Khadijah, Zahra, Shireen, Banu, Fatema, and Zainab.

Saifuddin descends from the family of the early leaders of the Fatimid mission in India, Fakhr al-Din and Abd al-Qadir Hakim al-Din.

Works

Rasāʾil Ramaḍāniyya (Epistles)
Saifuddin's Risalah are peculiarly titled gematrically equivalent to the Hijri year of its publication.

Recognition
Saifuddin was conferred Doctor of Theology by Aligarh Muslim University on 15 April 1946, and later  accepted the chancellorship for which he was elected to for four consecutive terms.

Saifuddin was among the first to be conferred Doctor of Laws by Karachi University .

Saifuddin was voted among 100 Greatest Indian Muslims of the Twentieth Century in an opinion poll run by Milli Gazette.

Death

Saifuddin died on 12 November 1965 (19 Rajab al-Asab 1385H) at Matheran, a hill-station in Maharashtra, India. He is buried at Raudat Tahera, a mausoleum opposite Ghurrat-ul Masajid in South Bombay, constructed by his successor, Mohammed Burhanuddin.

Legacy

The Dandi Memorial
Saifuddin donated his home Saifee Villa in Dandi, Navsari where Gandhi stayed for ten days during his historic march from Sabarmati Ashram against the English Salt Laws, to Nehru in 1961. It was later converted into a National Museum. Present day, it lies adjacent to the 15-acre National Salt Satyagraha Memorial which was inaugurated by Narendra Modi in 2019.

Aligarh Muslim University

The Syedna Taher Saifuddin School at Aligarh Muslim University (AMU) is named after him in his honour. Saifuddin was the longest serving chancellor at AMU at 12 years, and was a patron of the Ali Society at AMU.

Hospitals
Saifee Hospital in Mumbai, inaugurated by Prime Minister Manmohan Singh in 2005, was dedicated to Saifuddin by his successor, Mohammed Burhanuddin, who built the hospital in social service. Saifee Hospital was one of the first responders to 2008 Mumbai Terror Attacks. Another hospital of the same name was built by Mohammed Burhanuddin in Karachi and dedicated to his father.

Housing
In 2009 Mohammed Burhanuddin founded Saifee Burhani Upliftment Trust (SBUT), a large-scale cluster redevelopment project in Bhendi Bazaar and dedicated it to his father, Saifuddin. The Government of Maharashtra plans to develop Kamathipura, one of the oldest neighborhoods of South Mumbai, after the cluster redevelopment model pioneered by SBUT.

Remembrance
Saifuddin's urs is commemorated annually by the Dai al-Mutlaq at Saifee Masjid, South Bombay. Aljamea-tus-Saifiyah's annual examinations, Imtihan al-Sanawi, commence after the Dai al-Mutlaq delivers the Zikra sermons in remembrance of Saifuddin.

Memorials

Shortly after Saifuddin's demise, on 18 March 1966 Mohammed Burhanuddin established His Holiness Dr. Syedna Taher Saifuddin Memorial Trust for educational and medicinal financial aid for  institutions and individuals.

In memory of his father Burhanuddin set up Matheran Memorial Hall, a museum and lodging facility in the hill station of Matheran, where Saifuddin died.

Notes

References

Further reading
Abdul Qaiyum Mulla Habibullah, His Holiness Syedna Taher Saifuddin Saheb, Dai-ul-Mutlaq of Dawoodi Bohra, Dawoodi Bohra Book Depot Publications, 1953.
 

Life and Works of His Holiness Syedna Dr. Taher Saifuddin Saheb, Leader Press Pvt. Ltd. Publications.
Jafar us Sadiq Mufaddal Saifuddin, Al Aqmar: A Living Testimony to the Fatemiyeen, Al Jamea tus Saifiyah Publications, 2000.
Jafar us Sadiq Mufaddal Saifuddin, Al Juyushi: A Vision of the Fatemiyeen, Al Jamea tus Saifiyah Publications, 2002.
Mustafa Abdulhussein, Al-Dai Al-Fatimi Syedna Mohammed Burhanuddin: An Illustrated Biography, Al Jamea tus Saifiyah Publications.

See also
List of Dai of Dawoodi Bohra

External links

Dawoodi Bohra da'is
Vice-Chancellors of the Aligarh Muslim University
Scholars from Gujarat
1888 births
1965 deaths
Gujarati people
People from Surat
Deified people
20th-century Ismailis